Sugar Lake may refer to:

Sugar Lake (Aitkin County, Minnesota)
Sugar Lake (Wright County, Minnesota)
Sugar Lake (Canada), a lake in the upper Shuswap River basin, British Columbia, Canada
Codville Lagoon Marine Provincial Park, formerly Sugar Lake Provincial Park, British Columbia
Sugar Lake, a lake in Manchester Township, Freeborn County, Minnesota, United States
Sugar Lake Division, one of the two land divisions comprising Erie National Wildlife Refuge, Pennsylvania, United States